Vyacheslav Leedo (born 1952) is an Estonian entrepreneur.

He was born in Kuressaare.

In 1991, he bought three cargo ships. Since 1995, he is the key figure of ship transportation related to Saaremaa and Hiiumaa. He is the owner of Saaremaa Shipping Company.

In 2000s, Leedo had a long-lasting court trial against Delfi news portal, because the portal was responsible of publishing defamatory comments about Leedo activities. 

In 2005, his assets were estimated at 110 million kroons (7 million euros), in 2006 at 180.26 million kroons and in 2007 at 461 million kroons (29.5 million euros).

In 2015, Leedo ultimately won the court trial.

References

Living people
1952 births
Estonian businesspeople
People from Kuressaare